Juan Vázquez Coronado de Sayás (died 1571) was a Roman Catholic prelate who served as Bishop of Acerra (1568–1571).

Biography
Juan Vázquez Coronado de Sayás was born in Spain. 
On 23 July 1568, he was appointed during the papacy of Pope Pius V as Bishop of Acerra.
He served as Bishop of Acerra until his death in 1571.

References

External links and additional sources
 (for Chronology of Bishops) 
 (for Chronology of Bishops) 

16th-century Italian Roman Catholic bishops
Bishops appointed by Pope Pius V
1571 deaths